Georgia Wilson (born 2 October 1995) is a British equestrian, who won bronze in the individual championship test grade II and individual freestyle test grade II events at the 2020 Summer Paralympics. She also won the individual championship grade II event at the 2019 FEI European Championships.

Early life
Wilson is from Abergele, Wales. She started riding aged two as her mother was advised it would help with her balance as she has cerebral palsy. She attended Rydal Penrhos in Colwyn Bay.

Career
Wilson started training in Clwyd, Wales, and she is trained by fellow British dressage competitor Sophie Wells. She competed at the 2018 FEI World Equestrian Games. In January 2019, Wilson was one of six para-dressage competitors given National Lottery funding for the period from 2019 to 2021. That year, she competed 2019 FEI European Championships, her first European Championships, on horse Midnight. At the Championships, Wilson won the individual freestyle grade II event, and also came second in the individual championship test grade II event and team events. In September 2020, Wilson started competing with horse Sakura, also known as Suki.

Wilson was not initially selected for the delayed 2020 Summer Paralympics; instead, she was the team's reserve. On 12 August 2021, she was called up to the British Paralympic equestrian team, replacing Sophie Christiansen whose horse was injured. It was her first Paralympic Games, and the first major championship event for Sakura. At the Games, Wilson won bronze medals in the individual championship test grade II and individual freestyle test grade II events. At one point in the individual championship event, Wilson was winning the event, and her individual championship medal was the first for a Welsh person at the Games. Her individual test score of 72.765 was only just behind Austria's Pepo Puch, who finished second in the event.

References

External links
 
 British Equestrian

1995 births
Living people
British female equestrians
British dressage riders
Paralympic equestrians of Great Britain
Paralympic bronze medalists for Great Britain
Paralympic medalists in equestrian
Medalists at the 2020 Summer Paralympics
Equestrians at the 2020 Summer Paralympics
People with cerebral palsy
21st-century British women
People from Abergele
Sportspeople from Conwy County Borough
People educated at Rydal Penrhos